Peter William Barca (born August 7, 1955) is an American Democratic politician and the current Secretary of the Wisconsin Department of Revenue in the administration of Governor Tony Evers.  Barca is a lifelong resident of the Kenosha area.

Barca represented the northern part of the city of Kenosha and surrounding areas in the Wisconsin State Assembly for nine terms, covering the years 1985 through 1993 and 2009 through 2019, and was the Democratic floor leader from 2011 through 2017. He also served as a member of the 103rd U.S. Congress between 1993 and 1995, and was the Midwest Regional Administrator of the U.S. Small Business Administration during the presidency of Bill Clinton.

Early life and education
Barca was born in Kenosha, Wisconsin, on August 7, 1955, and spent his entire youth in the Kenosha area. He graduated from Mary D. Bradford High School in 1973 and earned his undergraduate degree from the University of Wisconsin–Milwaukee. He attended Harvard Graduate School and went on to earn an M.A. in public administration and educational administration from the University of Wisconsin–Madison in 1983.

Starting his career as a teacher of the emotionally disturbed and a team leader for students with special needs, Barca went on to become the director of the Friendship Camp, a camp for children with disabilities. He also served as an employment specialist.

Wisconsin State Assembly
Barca entered politics in 1984 when he won his first election to the State Assembly, succeeding Joseph Wimmer in the 64th District. At the time, the 64th District had just been redrawn to cover the northern half of the city of Kenosha and the town of Somers.

During his initial tenure in the State Capitol, Barca authored and passed a wide variety of proposals covering issues such as economic development, protection for seniors and the disabled, education, employment and job training, criminal justice, and environmental protection. He also worked closely with the Kenosha delegation to help pass legislation that led to the creation of the Lakeview Corporate Park.

Barca also chaired several special legislative committees that led to Wisconsin’s nationally recognized welfare reform program, implemented the award-winning 'one stop shop' employment and training systems, and developed the roadmap for rail services between Kenosha and Milwaukee.

In 1991 and 1993, Barca was elected Majority Caucus Chairperson in the State Assembly.

Barca resigned his seat in 1993 after being elected to U.S. House of Representatives.

U.S. Congress
In early 1993, newly-inaugurated President Bill Clinton appointed 22-year incumbent congressman Les Aspin as United States Secretary of Defense.  Aspin therefore had to resign his seat in Wisconsin's 1st congressional district and a special election was called to fill the balance of his term in the 103rd United States Congress. Barca narrowly won a competitive Democratic Primary election, fending off fellow State Assemblymembers Jeffrey A. Neubauer of Racine and Wayne W. Wood of Janesville.  In the general election, Barca faced Republican Mark Neumann, who had been Aspin's opponent in November 1992. Barca won by only 675 votes, mainly due to a weak showing in Racine. Neumann, in turn, defeated Barca in the regular 1994 election 17 months later.

Post-Congressional career
After Barca narrowly lost his re-election bid, President Clinton appointed him to serve as Midwest Regional Administrator to the U.S. Small Business Administration. He also served as National Ombudsman to the SBA. Barca was also leader of the National Regulatory Fairness Program, an initiative which included more than fifty company presidents throughout the country aimed at making regulatory enforcement small business friendly. He later went on to become Vice President and then President of Aurora Associates International, an international project management company.

Return to politics
In November 2008, after a 14-year absence, Barca was elected to represent the 64th District once again. He was again chosen to be Majority Caucus Chairperson, and served as co-chair of the Joint Legislative Audit Committee, and chair of the Partnership for a Stronger Economy.

As chair of the Partnership for a Stronger Economy, Barca traveled the state meeting with various small businesses owners and economic development professionals to craft an economic plan for Wisconsin. The Partnership led the way in helping to pass over 50 economic initiatives in the 2009–10 legislative session, including the Small Business Capital Access Program and the Entrepreneurial Assistance Grant Program, both authored by Barca.

In the 2010 midterm elections, Republicans won complete control of government in Wisconsin. Following the election, Barca was elected by his colleagues to serve as Assembly Democratic Leader in the 100th Wisconsin Legislative Session. He remained leader of the Democratic minority until September 2017, when he stepped down to focus more attention on his own constituency.

In the 2011 legislative session, Barca rose to national prominence as a leader in the struggle against Governor Scott Walker's proposed changes to collective bargaining in Wisconsin. Barca also led Assembly Democrats in protesting the Republicans' alleged violation of open meetings laws.

Barca authored legislation to ban text messaging while driving in Wisconsin.

On January 7, 2019, newly-inaugurated Governor of Wisconsin Tony Evers nominated Mr. Barca to serve as Secretary of the Wisconsin Department of Revenue.  Barca resigned his Assembly seat the next day.  The Senate Committee on Agriculture, Revenue and Financial Institutions unanimously approved his nomination on February 22, 2019, and the full Senate confirmed his appointment on October 8, 2019.

Redistricting

For most of his career representing the 64th District, his constituency was drawn to cover the northern half of the city of Kenosha and a portion of the town of Somers, in Kenosha County.  In 2011, however, the new Republican majority used their power to redraw the state's legislative maps.  Barca's district was altered to add southern portions of Racine County, including the village of Elmwood Park, as well as parts of the village of Mount Pleasant and the city of Racine. The redrawn map was designed by the new Republican majority to remove Democratic-leaning precincts from what had been the 62nd assembly district, and by doing so, also removing those precincts from the 21st senate district, which is defined by the boundaries of the 61st, 62nd and 63rd assembly districts.  This, along with other changes, successfully gerrymandered the previously-competitive 62nd assembly and 21st senate districts into safely Republican seats.

Electoral history

Wisconsin Assembly (1984-1992)

| colspan="6" style="text-align:center;background-color: #e9e9e9;"| Primary Election

| colspan="6" style="text-align:center;background-color: #e9e9e9;"| General Election

| colspan="6" style="text-align:center;background-color: #e9e9e9;"| Primary Election

| colspan="6" style="text-align:center;background-color: #e9e9e9;"| General Election

| colspan="6" style="text-align:center;background-color: #e9e9e9;"| Primary Election

| colspan="6" style="text-align:center;background-color: #e9e9e9;"| General Election

| colspan="6" style="text-align:center;background-color: #e9e9e9;"| Primary Election

| colspan="6" style="text-align:center;background-color: #e9e9e9;"| General Election

| colspan="6" style="text-align:center;background-color: #e9e9e9;"| Primary Election

| colspan="6" style="text-align:center;background-color: #e9e9e9;"| General Election

U.S. House of Representatives (1993, 1994)

| colspan="6" style="text-align:center;background-color: #e9e9e9;"| Democratic Primary Election, April 6, 1993

| colspan="6" style="text-align:center;background-color: #e9e9e9;"| Special Election, May 4, 1993

| colspan="6" style="text-align:center;background-color: #e9e9e9;"| General Election, November 8, 1994

Wisconsin Assembly (2008-2018)

| colspan="6" style="text-align:center;background-color: #e9e9e9;"| Primary Election

| colspan="6" style="text-align:center;background-color: #e9e9e9;"| General Election

| colspan="6" style="text-align:center;background-color: #e9e9e9;"| Primary Election

| colspan="6" style="text-align:center;background-color: #e9e9e9;"| General Election

| colspan="6" style="text-align:center;background-color: #e9e9e9;"| Primary Election

| colspan="6" style="text-align:center;background-color: #e9e9e9;"| General Election

| colspan="6" style="text-align:center;background-color: #e9e9e9;"| Primary Election

| colspan="6" style="text-align:center;background-color: #e9e9e9;"| General Election

| colspan="6" style="text-align:center;background-color: #e9e9e9;"| Primary Election

| colspan="6" style="text-align:center;background-color: #e9e9e9;"| General Election

| colspan="6" style="text-align:center;background-color: #e9e9e9;"| Primary Election

| colspan="6" style="text-align:center;background-color: #e9e9e9;"| General Election

References

External links
 Representative Peter Barca (Archived) at Wisconsin Legislature
 Secretary Peter Barca at Wisconsin Department of Revenue
 
 
 
 

1955 births
Schoolteachers from Wisconsin
Educators from Wisconsin
Harvard Kennedy School alumni
Living people
Democratic Party members of the Wisconsin State Assembly
Politicians from Kenosha, Wisconsin
2012 United States presidential electors
University of Wisconsin–Madison alumni
University of Wisconsin–Milwaukee alumni
Democratic Party members of the United States House of Representatives from Wisconsin
21st-century American politicians